Jamāl al-Dīn Muḥammad ibn Ibrāhīm ibn Yaḥyā al-Kutubi, known as al-Waṭwāṭ ('the bat', 632-718 AH/1235-1318 CE) was a scholar and bookseller; he was born and died in Cairo.

Works and editions
Al-Waṭwāṭ's works include:
 
  (Mabāhij al-fikar wa manāhij al-ʿibar, 'Delightful Concepts and the Path to Precepts'). The fourth section on this work was the first original Arabic work on agriculture since Ibn Wahshiyya's tenth-century Kitāb al-Filāḥa al-Nabaṭiyya, of which al-Waṭwāṭ made extensive use.
 Muḥammad ibn Ibrāhīm ibn Yaḥyá Jamāl al-Dīn al-Kutubī al-maʻrūf bi-al-Waṭwāṭ,  [Mabāhij al-fikar wa-manāhij al-ʿibar: al-qism al-nabātī], ed. by Nāṣir Ḥusayn Aḥmad (Baghdād: al-Majmaʻ al-ʻIlmī, 2008).

Further reading
 Al-Waṭwāṭ, Filāḥa Texts Project.

References

1225 births
1318 deaths
13th-century Arabic writers
14th-century Arabic writers
Encyclopedists of the medieval Islamic world